Pawtuckaway can refer to:

Pawtuckaway Lake, in Nottingham, New Hampshire
Pawtuckaway River, in Rockingham County, New Hampshire
Pawtuckaway State Park, in Rockingham County, New Hampshire